Tapas Roy is an Indian politician. He is currently Minister of State for Planning and Statistics in West Bengal, India. He was elected as a legislator of the West Bengal Legislative Assembly in 2001, 2011, 2016 and 2021. He is an All India Trinamool Congress politician.

References

 

Trinamool Congress politicians from West Bengal
Living people
West Bengal MLAs 2001–2006
West Bengal MLAs 2011–2016
West Bengal MLAs 2016–2021
1956 births